WQXW (90.3 FM) is an all-classical music radio station licensed to Ossining, New York. It simulcasts WQXR-FM, the only classical music station in New York City.

WQXW now covers much of northern and central Westchester County, reaching northern portions of the New York metropolitan area where WQXR cannot reach. WQXW's antenna tower is located in Pleasantville, New York.

History

The radio station originated in 1982 as WDFH, a community radio station that broadcast a freeform format of progressive and alternative rock, jazz, blues, and folk. WDFH had a several-decades long history, starting out as a cable-based station in the 1980s and finally moving to the FM band in 1992.

One of WDFH's notable programs in its final years was OutCasting, a program for LGBTQ youth.

On July 29, 2013, WDFH ceased broadcasting, and the broadcast license was subsequently purchased by New York Public Radio, changing call letters to WQXW and becoming a rebroadcaster of WQXR.

References

External links 
 

QXW
Classical music radio stations in the United States
Radio stations established in 1992
1992 establishments in New York (state)
New York Public Radio